Gordon George Avery, known as George Avery, (11 February 1925 – 22 September 2006) was an Australian athlete who mainly competed in the men's triple jump event. He was born in Moree, New South Wales and died in Woonona, New South Wales.

He competed for Australia in the 1948 Summer Olympics held in London, Great Britain in the triple jump where he won the silver medal.

At the time of competing in the 1948 Summer Olympics, Gordon George AVERY was employed as a Constable with the New South Wales Police Force.

References

 Profile

1925 births
2006 deaths
Australian male triple jumpers
Olympic silver medalists for Australia
Athletes (track and field) at the 1948 Summer Olympics
Olympic athletes of Australia
People from the North West Slopes
Medalists at the 1948 Summer Olympics
Olympic silver medalists in athletics (track and field)
Sportsmen from New South Wales